Love in Space is a 1996 live album by the English space rock group Hawkwind. It was recorded during the group's 1995 tour to promote the Alien 4 album.

It was re-issued in 2009 with bonus tracks taken from the Love in Space EP.

Track listing

CD1
"Abducted" (Ron Tree, Dave Brock) – 2:53
"Death Trap" (Robert Calvert, Brock) – 4:42
"Wastelands" ( "Wastelands of Sleep") (Brock) – 1:35
"Are You Losing Your Mind?" (Tree, Brock, Alan Davey, Richard Chadwick) – 3:08
"Photo Encounter" (Brock) – 2:16
"Blue Skin" (Tree, Brock, Davey, Chadwick) – 6:56
"Sputnik Stan" (Davey) – 10:20
"Robot" (Calvert, Brock) – 7:38
"Alien (I Am)" (Brock) – 8:52

CD2
"Xenomorph" (Tree, Davey) – 5:16
"Vega" (Davey) – 3:33
"Love in Space" (Brock) – 9:43
"Kapal" (Brock, Davey, Chadwick) – 6:05
"Elfin" (Davey) – 2:09
"Silver Machine" (Calvert, Brock) – 3:35
"Welcome to the Future" (Calvert) – 2:10
"Assassins" ( "Hassan-i-Sabah" (Calvert, Paul Rudolph) / "Space Is Their (Palestine)" (Brock)] – 8:40

Atomhenge CD bonus tracks
"Love in Space" (Brock) [Studio Version] - 4:48
"Lord of Light" (Brock) [Live] - 3:52
"This is Hawkwind Sonic Attack" (Michael Moorcock, Brock) [re-mix] - 7:05

Personnel
Hawkwind
Ron Tree – vocals
Dave Brock – electric guitar, keyboards, vocals
Alan Davey – bass guitar, vocals
Richard Chadwick – drums
Liam Yates, Michelle Gaskell – dancers
Kris Tait, Wango Riley – fire eaters

Credits
Produced by Hawkwind and Paul Cobbold. Engineered by Paul Cobbold.
Recorded on the Alien 4 tour, 1995.
Cover by Alan Arthurs.

Release history
1996: Emergency Broadcast System Records, EBS120, 2CD
29 June 2009: Atomhenge (Cherry Red) Records, ATOMCD2013, UK 2CD

References

External links
Collectable Records - Original gatefold cover
Atomhenge Records

Hawkwind live albums
1996 live albums